The 1995 Island Games were the sixth Island Games, and were held in the British Overseas Territory of  Gibraltar, from 15 July to 22 July 1995. The Government of Gibraltar furnished Lathbury Barracks with 1,000 bunkbeds to accommodate the competing athletes. The Royal Navy had previously used the barracks as a training camp.

Medal table

Sports
The sports chosen for the games were:

References

External links
 1995 Island Games

Island Games
International sports competitions hosted by Gibraltar
Island Games, 1995
Island Games
Multi-sport events in the United Kingdom
July 1995 sports events in Europe